Gare de Culmont-Chalindrey is a railway station serving the small towns Culmont and Chalindrey, Haute-Marne department, eastern France. It is an important railway junction, situated on the Paris–Mulhouse railway, the Is-sur-Tille–Culmont-Chalindrey railway (toward Dijon) and the Culmont-Chalindrey–Toul railway (toward Nancy).

The station is served by regional trains towards Paris, Reims, Nancy, Mulhouse and Dijon.

References

Railway stations in Grand Est
Railway stations in France opened in 1858